Gondia (also spelled Gondiya) is a city and municipal council in the Indian state of Maharashtra which serves the administrative headquarters of the eponymous administrative district. Gondia is also known as Rice City due to the abundance of rice mills in the area.Gondia Airport is only airport in district.

Industry

Adani Power Maharashtra Limited (APML), is 3 km away from Tirora on Tirora-Gondia state road. Coal is transported to Adani power, Ltd through a railway which is connected to Kachewani Railway Station. Water is being used from nearby weir constructed on Wainganga River. An 85.89% subsidiary of Adani Power Limited is implementing 3300 MW Thermal Power Station in Tirora.

History
The region is named after the Gondi people, an Adivasi group in central India.

During British rule in India, the Great Famine of 1876–78 provided an opportunity for the construction of a  metre-gauge rail link called the Nagpur Chhattisgarh Railway, connecting Nagpur with Rajnandgaon. Gondia railway station was created when this line began operation in December 1888. Bengal Nagpur Railway (BNR) was formed in 1887 to upgrade and extend this line, and in 1902 BNR was contracted to provide a railway line from Gondia to Jabalpur with branches from Nainpur to Mandla as well as Nainpur to Seoni and Chhindwara. With these links and the commerce they brought, Gondia grew and prospered.

Geography

Climate

Location
Gondia is very close to the state of Madhya Pradesh, Chhattisgarh and is considered the gateway to Maharashtra from central and eastern India. Tirora is only nearby city. Gondia municipal council was established in 1920. At that time Gondia had only 10 wards population up to 20,000 and an area of 7.5 km2. Gondia has 42 wards, as well as population nearing up to 2 lakhs. The urbanization has crossed municipal limits merging into nearby villages like Kudwa, Katangi, Fulchur, Nagra, Karanja, Murri, Pindkepar, and Khamari. The Ministry of Urban Development has recently announced to merge 20 nearby villages into Gondia to give the city status of Municipal Corporation. It is connected with National Highway 543 and 753.

Economy

The city has a large number of rice mills.

Transportation

Road

The Mumbai–Nagpur–Kolkata Road is the only national highway passing through the district, covering a total distance of 99.37 km (62 mi). Gondia is situated about 170 km by road from Nagpur of Vidarbha region. The district has road links to adjoining districts Chandrapur, Bhandara, Nagpur. The city is well connected by roads. It takes around 4 hours journey from Nagpur by State Transport Bus to reach Gondia. Gondia has bus connectivity to Jabalpur, Nagpur, Raipur and Hyderabad.

Rail 

Gondia Junction railway station is a junction in Maharashtra, with heavy passenger and goods traffic. It is an A-Grade station.

It lies on the Howrah–Mumbai route. The station has seven platforms, each with potable water, tea stalls, benches and waiting sheds. There is also a fruit stall and a bookstall. The station is equipped with air-conditioned waiting rooms for passengers travelling by upper accommodation classes and a waiting hall for passengers travelling by lower accommodation classes.

The Gondia–Jabalpur Junction (Madhya Pradesh) section of South East Central Railway runs north–south, along the valley of the Wainganga River. The line was formerly narrow gauge (762 mm [2 ft 6 in]) along its entire length, but the section between Gondia and Balaghat was converted to broad gauge in 2005–2006, connecting Balaghat to India's national broad-gauge network. Work is completed to convert the Balaghat–Jabalpur section to broad gauge as well.

Railway milestones for Gondia include:
 1888 – Gondia Railway Station was opened to the public.
 1901 – Satpura Express began first class service.
 1903 – The first portion of Gondia–Nainpur was opened.
 1905 – Nainpur–Gondia line was extended to Jabalpur.
 1908 – Gondia–Nagbhir–Nagpur line was opened for traffic. Mr. Manson was an agent of BNR at that time.
 1990-91 – Paniajob–Gondia and Gondia–Bhandara Road sections were electrified.
 1999 – Gauge-converted Gondia–Balharshah line opened.
 2005 – Gauge-converted Gondia–Balaghat section opened.

Airport 
Gondia Airport is situated near Kamtha village,  from Gondia. This airstrip was built by the British in 1940, during World War II. Initially run by the Public Works Department, it was taken over by the state-owned Maharashtra Industrial Development Corporation (MIDC) from August 1998 to December 2005, after which it has been operated by the Airports Authority of India (AAI).

References 

Cities and towns in Gondia district
Talukas in Maharashtra
Cities in Maharashtra